O Ébrio is a Brazilian telenovela produced and broadcast by TV Globo. It premiered on 8 November 1965 and ended on 18 February 1966. It's the first "novela das oito" to be aired on the timeslot.

Written and directed by José Castellar and Heloísa Castellar.

Cast

References

External links 
 

TV Globo telenovelas
1965 Brazilian television series debuts
1966 Brazilian television series endings
1965 telenovelas
Brazilian telenovelas
Portuguese-language telenovelas
Alcohol abuse in television